Narosodes hampsoni is a moth of the family Erebidae. It was described by Max Wilhelm Karl Draudt in 1914. It is found on Borneo.

References

 

Nudariina
Moths described in 1914